The Irwin Belk Complex is a multi-use 4,500 seat stadium on the campus of Johnson C. Smith University (JCSU) in Charlotte, North Carolina United States. The stadium plays host to JCSU events. It is named for benefactor, Irwin Belk of Belk stores fame.

References

College football venues
College track and field venues in the United States
Johnson C. Smith Golden Bulls football
American football venues in North Carolina
Athletics (track and field) venues in North Carolina
Sports venues in Charlotte, North Carolina
Sports venues completed in 2003
2003 establishments in North Carolina